Worden may refer to:

People
 Worden Day (1912–1986), American painter, printmaker, and sculptor
 Alfred Worden (1932–2020), United States astronaut
 Dennis Worden, American comics artist
 Hank Worden (1901–1992), American actor
 James Worden (1819–1884), Justice of the Indiana Supreme Court 
 John Lorimer Worden (1818–1897), United States admiral during the American Civil War
 Marc Worden (born 1976), Canadian-American actor
 Nigel Worden (born 1955), British/South African historian
 Pete Worden (born 1949), director of NASA's Ames Research Center
 Robert Worden (1809–1893), American politician
 Sarah A. Worden (1855-1918), American painter, art instructor

Places

United States
 Worden, Illinois, a village
 Worden, Kansas, an unincorporated community
 Worden, Michigan, an unincorporated community
 Worden, Montana, a census-designated place
 Worden, Oregon, an unincorporated community
 Worden, Wisconsin, a town
 Worden (ghost town), Wisconsin, a ghost town
 Worden Field, a grass field on the campus of the United States Naval Academy in Annapolis, Maryland
 Worden Pond, Rhode Island

Elsewhere
 Wörden, a subdivision of Nachrodt-Wiblingwerde, North Rhine-Westphalia, Germany
 Worden Park, Leyland, Lancashire, England

Other uses
 USS Worden, several ships
 Worden High School and Worden Sports College, former names of Academy@Worden, Leyland, Lancashire, England
 Worden (horse), a French Thoroughbred racehorse